Stenocercus eunetopsis is a species of lizard of the Tropiduridae family. It is found in Peru.

References

Stenocercus
Reptiles described in 1991
Endemic fauna of Peru
Reptiles of Peru